Steward Island (also Stewart Ø in some sources) is an uninhabited island in King Christian IX Land, at the eastern end of Greenland. Administratively it is part of the Sermersooq municipality.

The island is mountainous and clearly visible from a distance. According to mariners' reports the island is a good landmark for vessels approaching Greenland from the east.

Geography
Steward is a coastal island of the Blosseville Coast located in a bay off the Savoia Peninsula. It lies 39 km to the SW of Cape Brewster and 7.5 km to the northeast of the small Manby Peninsula.

See also
List of islands of Greenland

References

External links
The first view of Greenland flying into Constable Pynt by a Fokker 50
Den grønlandske Lods - Sejladsanvisninger Østgrønland
 East coast of Greenland. From Ihersuak to Umivik Bay. Surveyed during the 7th journey of the British Arctic Air Route Expedition, 1931
Gazetteer of Greenland
Uninhabited islands of Greenland
Sermersooq